The 2016 Båstad Challenger is a professional tennis tournament played on clay courts. It is the first edition of the tournament which is part of the 2016 ATP Challenger Tour. It will take place in Båstad, Sweden between 4 and 10 July 2016.

Singles main-draw entrants

Seeds

 1 Rankings are as of June 27, 2016.

Other entrants
The following players received wildcards into the singles main draw:
  Isak Arvidsson 
  Markus Eriksson
  Christian Lindell
  Carl Söderlund
 
The following players received entry from the qualifying draw:
  Maxim Dubarenco 
  Scott Griekspoor
  Prajnesh Gunneswaran
  Zhang Ze

The following player entered as a lucky loser:
  Hubert Hurkacz

Champions

Singles

  Horacio Zeballos def.  Roberto Carballés Baena, 6–3, 6–4

Doubles

  Isak Arvidsson /  Fred Simonsson def.  Johan Brunström /  Andreas Siljeström, 6–3, 7–5

External links

Bastad Challenger
Båstad Challenger
Bast